Líjar is a municipality of Almería province, in the autonomous community of Andalusia, Spain. On October 14, 1883, Lijar declared war on France because, "Our King Alfonso, when passing through Paris on the 29th day of September was stoned and offended in the most cowardly fashion by miserable hordes of the French nation." No actual fighting ever took place. In 1983, Lijar declared peace.

Demographics

Source: INE (Spain)

References

External links
  Líjar - Sistema de Información Multiterritorial de Andalucía
  Líjar - Diputación Provincial de Almería

Municipalities in the Province of Almería